Anne Maddocks (23 October 1911 in Heyshott, West Sussex – October 2006) was an English musician. Maddocks' parents were enthusiastic amateur musicians and, by the age of 14, Anne was playing the organ for services at two village churches. In 1942 she was  appointed Assistant Organist at Chichester Cathedral by Horace Hawkins (a pupil of Widor) who was the cathedral's Organist & Master of the Choristers. She was the first woman in Great Britain to hold such a post in the cathedral. She had perfect pitch and as Hawkins  put it, she played Widor's music "with the master's interpretation". She gave the first British performance of Poulenc's Organ Concerto in Chichester Cathedral in 1943.

She was married to Morris Maddocks, then curate of St Peter's Church, Ealing and later Assistant Bishop of Bath and Wells, in Chichester Cathedral in 1955. In 1983, she and her husband started the Acorn Christian Healing Foundation. 11 years later, Anne and Morris retired to the Cathedral Close, Chichester where they frequently attended Evensong in the cathedral. Anne died in October 2006 and her funeral was in Chichester Cathedral, where Charles Widor's Mass was sung.

See also
Morris Maddocks

References

1911 births
2006 deaths
Morris Maddocks
English organists
Assistant Organists of Chichester Cathedral
People from Heyshott
20th-century classical musicians
20th-century English musicians
20th-century organists